The 2020–21 Arizona Wildcats women's basketball team represented University of Arizona during the 2020–21 NCAA Division I women's basketball season. The Wildcats, led by fifth-year head coach Adia Barnes, play their home games at the McKale Center and are members of the Pac-12 Conference. The Wildcats finished the season second behind Stanford in the Pacific-12 conference with a 13–4 record. They advanced to the semifinals of the 2021 Pac-12 women's tournament where they lost to no. 9 ranked UCLA and As a no. 3 seed in the NCAA tournament where they defeated Stony Brook and BYU in the first and second rounds, no. 4 ranked Texas A&M in the Sweet Sixteen, they won their region with a win over no. 12 ranked Indiana in the first-ever Elite Eight, knocked off no. 1 ranked UConn in the first-ever Final Four. Arizona reached the first-ever National Championship game, losing to no. 2 ranked Stanford (in a rematch from earlier this season) 54–53 and finishing the season with a 21–6 record.

Previous season
The Wildcats finished the season 24–7, 12–6 in Pac-12 play to finish in fourth place. They advanced to the semifinals of the Pac-12 women's tournament where they lost to Oregon.  The NCAA tournament and WNIT were cancelled due to the COVID-19 pandemic.

Offseason

Departures

Recruits

2021 recruiting class

2022 recruiting class

Personal

Roster 

 Madison Conner was only on the roster for the spring semester of 2020/2021 season, joining the team in March 2021, after reclassify from 2021 season class.

Schedule

Source:

|-
!colspan=6 style=| Regular Season

|-
!colspan=6 style=|Pac-12 Women's Tournament

|-
!colspan=6 style=|NCAA tournament

Rankings

References

Arizona Wildcats women's basketball seasons
Arizona
Arizona Wildcats women's basketball
Arizona Wildcats women's basketball
Arizona
NCAA Division I women's basketball tournament Final Four seasons